Davson may refer to:

Sir Charles Davson (1857–1933), British colonial judge
Sir Edward Davson, 1st Baronet (1875–1937), British businessman
Sir Henry Katz Davson (1830-1909), British Guianan merchant 
Hugh Davson (1909–1996), English physiologist 
Sir Ivan Davson (1884–1947), British businessman
Percival Davson (1877–1959), British fencer and tennis player 
Victor Davson, Guyanese-American artist

See also
Davson baronets
Davson–Danielli model